Events from the year 1812 in Ireland.

Events
1 October – English balloonist James Sadler starts a balloon flight from Belvedere House near Mullingar in an attempt to cross the Irish Sea. He fails and almost drowns as a result.
October – a storm washes away temporary barracks erected on Tuskar Rock for lighthouse construction, killing 14 workmen. 
Robert Peel, Chief Secretary for Ireland, introduces a mobile constabulary in Ireland, intended to be less partial than the yeomanry stationed in Ulster at this time, who are nearly all Orangemen.
Landowner John D'Arcy is granted a patent to hold a market at his new town of Clifden.

Births
14 May – Charles William Russell, Roman Catholic clergyman and scholar (died 1880).
19 May – Edwin Wyndham-Quin, 3rd Earl of Dunraven and Mount-Earl, peer (died 1871).
29 May – Thomas O'Hagan, 1st Baron O'Hagan, Lord Chancellor of Ireland (died 1885).
5 July – Frederick Edward Maning, writer and judge in New Zealand (died 1883).
12 July – C. P. Meehan, priest, poet and writer (died 1890).
4 November – James Alipius Goold, Roman Catholic Bishop and Archbishop of Melbourne (died 1886).
Full date unknown
George Allman, naturalist, professor of natural history in Edinburgh (died 1898).
John Benson architect for Irish Industrial Exhibition, Great Industrial Exhibition (1853) and the 1855 Cork Opera House (died 1874)

Deaths
25 April – Edmond Malone, Shakespeare scholar and literary critic (born 1741).
22 June – Richard Kirwan, scientist (born 1733).
2 August – Edward Smyth, sculptor (born 1749).
27 August – John Blaquiere, 1st Baron de Blaquiere, soldier and politician (born 1732).
Full date unknown
Robert Owenson, actor and author (born 1744).

References

 
Years of the 19th century in Ireland
1810s in Ireland
Ireland
 Ireland